Shirley Crabtree, Jr. (14 November 1930 – 2 December 1997), better known as Big Daddy, was an English professional wrestler with a record-breaking 64-inch chest. He worked for Joint Promotions and the original British Wrestling Federation. Initially appearing on television as a heel, he teamed with Giant Haystacks. After splitting with Haystacks, he became a fan favourite and the top star of Joint Promotions from the late 1970s to the early 1990s.

Early life
He was the first child of a blacksmith's daughter and weighed about twelve pounds at birth. He was given the name Shirley, like his father, who was a professional player of rugby league for Halifax R.L.F.C. and part of the team that won the Challenge Cup at Wembley in 1931.  Shirley was traditionally a man's name but had become popular as a girl's name following the Brontë novel, Shirley.   In the 1930s, the name was especially associated with the child movie-star, Shirley Temple, and so the boy was teased and bullied at school.   His father abandoned the family when his son was seven, and so the bullying toughened up the young Crabtree in the manner portrayed by "A Boy Named Sue",

Professional wrestling career

Early career
Crabtree decided to follow in the footsteps of his father, Shirley Crabtree Sr., becoming a professional wrestler in 1952. He first became popular in the late 1950s, and early 1960s as a blue-eye billed as "Blond Adonis Shirley Crabtree." He won the European Heavyweight Championship in Joint Promotions and a disputed branch of the British Heavyweight title in the independent British Wrestling Federation before he quit in 1966 following a (non-kayfabe) campaign of harassment at wrestling shows by former champion Bert Assirati. He retired for roughly six years. During the 1960s Crabtree owned an underground nightclub in Bradford which is now called Sunbridge Wells.

Comeback
In 1972, Crabtree returned to Joint Promotions as a villain with a gimmick of the Battling Guardsman based on his former service with the Coldstream Guards. It was during this period that he made his first appearances on World of Sport on ITV.

Not long afterwards, Shirley's brother, Max, was appointed as Northern area booker with Joint Promotions and began to transform Crabtree into the persona for which he would be best remembered. Based originally on the character of the same name played by actor Burl Ives in the first screen adaptation of Tennessee Williams' Cat on a Hot Tin Roof (1958), 'Big Daddy' was first given life by Crabtree in late 1974, initially still as a villain. The character's leotards were emblazoned with just a large "D" and were fashioned by his wife Eunice from their chintz sofa. The character first gained attention in mid-1975 when he formed a tag team with TV newcomer Giant Haystacks and together they became notorious for crushing blue eye opponents. However, during this period, Daddy began to be cheered for the first time since his comeback when he entered into a feud with masked villain Kendo Nagasaki, especially when he pulled off Nagasaki's mask during a televised contest from Solihull in December 1975 (although the unmasked Nagasaki quickly won the bout moments later).

By the middle of 1977, Daddy had completed his transformation into a blue eye, a change cemented by the breakdown of his tag team with Haystacks and a subsequent feud between the two which would last until the early 1990s. A firm fans' favourite particularly amongst children, Big Daddy came to the ring in either a sequinned cape or a Union Flag jacket and top hat. In addition to his feud with Haystacks, Daddy also feuded with Canadian wrestler 'Mighty' John Quinn. He headlined Wembley Arena with singles matches against Quinn in 1979 and Haystacks in 1981, as well as a tag match in 1980 with Wayne Bridges against Quinn and Yasu Fuji. Later in the 1980s he feuded with Dave "Fit" Finlay, Drew McDonald and numerous other villains.

In August 1987 at the Hippodrome circus in Great Yarmouth, Big Daddy performed in a tag team match pitting himself and nephew Steve Crabtree (billed as "Greg Valentine") against King Kong Kirk and King Kendo. After Big Daddy had delivered a splash and pinned King Kong Kirk, rather than selling the impact of the finishing move, Kirk turned an unhealthy colour and was rushed to a nearby hospital where he was pronounced dead on arrival. Despite the fact that the inquest into Kirk's death found that he had a serious heart condition and cleared Crabtree of any responsibility, Crabtree was devastated.

He continued to make regular appearances into the early 1990s, but he eventually retired from wrestling altogether in 1993 to spend the remainder of his days in his home town of Halifax. During his career, Prime Minister Margaret Thatcher and Queen Elizabeth II said they were fans of 'Big Daddy'.

Personal life 
Crabtree was a professional rugby league footballer for Bradford Northern, and Halifax (Heritage No. 364). His temper often forced him off the pitch early. He also had stints as a coal miner and with the British Army's Coldstream Guards.

Crabtree's 64-inch chest earned him a place in the Guinness Book of Records.

His brother Brian Crabtree was a wrestling referee and later MC, while his younger brother Max was a booker for – and later proprietor of – Joint Promotions. His nephews Steve and Scott Crabtree also had wrestling careers – Steve wrestled in the 1980s, and 1990s, billed as 'Greg Valentine' (named after the American wrestler of the same name) while Scott wrestled as Scott Valentine. Both worked as tag team partners for their uncle. Another nephew; Eorl Crabtree is a former rugby league footballer for England and the Huddersfield Giants.

Crabtree died of a stroke in December 1997 in Halifax General Hospital. He was survived by his second wife of 31 years, Eunice and six children.

Other media
Big Daddy had his own comic strip in Buster during the early 1980s drawn by Mike Lacey. In 1982 ITV planned to build a TV programme around 'Big Daddy' as a replacement for the popular children's Saturday morning Tiswas show. A pilot for Big Daddy's Saturday Show was shot and a series announced but Crabtree pulled out at the last moment, leaving the hastily renamed The Saturday Show presented by Isla St Clair and Tommy Boyd. 

A stage play by Brian Mitchell and Joseph Nixon, Big Daddy vs Giant Haystacks premiered at the Brighton Festival Fringe in East Sussex, England between 26–28 May 2011 and subsequently toured Great Britain.

Big Daddy features on Luke Haines' 2011 album 9½ Psychedelic Meditations on British Wrestling of the 1970s, and early '80s as the owner of a Casio VL-Tone synthesizer.

In late 2021 Big Daddy had a Retro figure released through Chella toys for a 2022 Release.

Championships and accomplishments

British Wrestling Federation
British Heavyweight Championship (1 time)
European Heavyweight Championship (2 times)

Notes

External links
 Obituary in The Independent
 BBC.co.uk's h2g2 article – The Immortal Legends of British Professional Wrestling

1930 births
1997 deaths
Coldstream Guards soldiers
English male professional wrestlers
Sportspeople from Halifax, West Yorkshire
Bradford Bulls players
Crabtree family
20th-century professional wrestlers